Maruthuvakkudi is a village in the Papanasam taluk of Thanjavur district, Tamil Nadu, India.

Demographics 

As per the 2001 census, Maruthuvakkudi had a total population of 796 with 389 males and 407 females. The sex ratio was 1046. The literacy rate was 65.86.

References 

 

Villages in Thanjavur district